A cash sorter machine is a machine used for sorting banknotes. Cash Sorters can file through a number of banknotes, and sort it into denominations. Many Cash Sorters also function as a banknote counter, and can count money as well as splitting them into groups. Some cash sorters can also detect counterfeit money using security features of the banknote. Primary users are banks, financial institutions, casinos, and large theme parks, as they all come across large amounts of cash.

See also 

 Currency-counting machine
 Banknote counter

Banking equipment